Charles Albert (2 October 1798 – 28 July 1849) was the King of Sardinia from 27 April 1831 until 23 March 1849. His name is bound up with the first Italian constitution, the Albertine Statute, and with the First Italian War of Independence (1848–1849).

During the Napoleonic period, he resided in France, where he received a liberal education. As Prince of Carignano in 1821, he granted and then withdrew his support for a rebellion which sought to force Victor Emmanuel I to institute a constitutional monarchy. He became a conservative and participated in the legitimist expedition against the Spanish liberals in 1823.

He became king of Sardinia in 1831 on the death of his distant cousin Charles Felix, who had no heir. As king, after an initial conservative period during which he supported various European legitimist movements, he adopted the idea of a federal Italy, led by the Pope and freed from the House of Habsburg in 1848. In the same year he granted the Albertine Statute, the first Italian constitution, which remained in force until 1947.

Charles Albert led his forces against the Imperial Austrian army in the First Italian War of Independence (1848–1849), but was abandoned by Pope Pius IX and Ferdinand II of the Two Sicilies and was defeated in 1849 at the Battle of Novara, after which he abdicated in favour of his son, Victor Emmanuel II. Charles Albert died in exile a few months later in the Portuguese city of Porto.

The attempt to free northern Italy from Austria represents the first attempt of the House of Savoy to alter the equilibrium established in the Italian peninsula after the Congress of Vienna. These efforts were continued successfully by his son Victor Emmanuel II, who became the first king of a unified Italy in 1861.

Charles Albert received a number of nicknames, including "the Italian Hamlet" (given to him by Giosuè Carducci on account of his gloomy, hesitant and enigmatic character) and "the Hesitant King" (Re Tentenna) because he hesitated for a long time between the establishment of a constitutional monarchy and the reinforcement of absolute rule.

Early life and studies

He was born at the Palazzo Carignano in Turin on 2 October 1798, to Charles Emmanuel, Prince of Carignano and Maria Cristina of Saxony. His father was the great-great-great-grandson of Thomas Francis, Prince of Carignano, youngest legitimate son of Charles Emmanuel I, Duke of Savoy, and founder of the Carignano line of the House of Savoy. Since he did not belong to the main line of the House of Savoy his chances at birth of succeeding to the kingdom were slim. Although the reigning king, Charles Emmanuel IV, had no children, at his death the throne would pass to his brother Victor Emmanuel and then to the latter's son Charles Emmanuel. After that in the line of succession there were two further brothers of Charles Emmanuel IV: Maurizio Giuseppe and Charles Felix. But in 1799, two of these heirs died: the young Charles Emmanuel (aged only three years) and Maurizio Giuseppe (from malaria in Sardinia).

The Napoleonic period
Charles Albert's father, Charles Emmanuel of Carignano, had studied in France and had been an officer in the French army. Sympathetic to liberalism, he travelled to Turin in 1796, in the wake of the French invasion of 1796 and King Charles Emmanuel IV's flight into exile. There Charles Emmanuel of Carignano and his wife joined the French cause. Despite this, the pair were sent to Paris, where they were placed under surveillance and forced to live in poor conditions in a house in the suburbs. These were the circumstances in which their children, Charles Albert and his sister Maria Elisabeth (born 13 April 1800), grew up.

On 16 August 1800, Charles Emmanuel of Carignano died suddenly. It was up to Charles Albert's mother to deal with the French, who had no intention of recognising her rights, titles or property. She nonetheless refused to send her son to the Savoy family in Sardinia for a conservative education. In 1808, Maria Christina married for a second time, to Giuseppe Massimiliano Thibaut di Montléart, whose relationship with Charles Albert was poor.

When he was twelve years old, Charles Albert and his mother were finally granted an audience with Napoleon, who granted the boy the title of count and an annual pension. Since it was no longer appropriate for him to be educated at home, Charles Albert was sent to the Collège Stanislas in Paris in 1812. He remained at the school for two years, but did not attend regularly; instead, he attended only to sit exams, apparently with success. In the meantime, Albertina had moved to Geneva, where Charles Albert joined her from March 1812 to December 1813, and she was married to the Protestant Pastor, Jean-Pierre Etienne Vaucher (1763–1841), a follower of Jean-Jacques Rousseau.

After Napoleon's defeat at the Battle of Leipzig in October 1813, the family left Geneva, fearing the arrival of Austrian forces and returned to France. At the beginning of 1814, Charles Albert enrolled in the military school in Bourges, hoping to become an officer in the French army. He was sixteen years old. Napoleon named him a lieutenant of dragoons in 1814.

First period in Turin (1814–1821) 

After Napoleon was defeated for good, the new king Louis XVIII celebrated the restoration of the Bourbon dynasty in Paris on 16 May 1814. Among those present at the festivities were Princess Maria Christina di Carignano and her children Charles Albert and Elisabetta. Despite their past, the family was treated well, although Charles Albert had to renounce the title of Count of the Empire, which had been conferred upon him at the military school in Bourges and the annuity which Napoleon had granted him.

The re-establishment of peace in Europe meant that Charles Albert could return to Turin, and he was advised to do so by his tutor, count Alessandro Di Saluzzo di Menusiglio, and by Albertina. He left Paris (and his step-father) and arrived in Turin on 24 May. There he was welcomed affectionately by King Victor Emmanuel I (Charles Emmanuel IV had abdicated in 1802) and his wife Queen Maria Theresa, by birth a Habsburg archduchess. His property and lands were restored to him and he was granted the Palazzo Carignano as a residence. Given the dynastic situation (neither Victor Emmanuel nor his brother Charles Felix had male children) Charles Albert was now the heir presumptive.

Thus he was assigned a mentor to counter the liberal ideas that he had learnt in France. The first of these was Count Filippo Grimaldi del Poggetto, and after he had failed, the dragoon, Policarpo Cacherano d'Osasco. Although he was better equipped for the task, he was not able to influence the mindset of Charles Albert, who began to suffer from anxiety at this time.

Marriage and personality 

The court decided that marriage would provide the prince with internal equilibrium. The chosen bride, accepted by Charles Albert, was the sixteen-year-old daughter of Ferdinand III of Tuscany, Archduchess Maria Theresa, a relative of Queen Maria Theresa. Charles Albert traveled to the Grand Duchy of Tuscany and then to Rome on 18 March 1817 and, after a 6-month engagement, married Maria Theresa on 30 September in Florence Cathedral.

The wedding was followed by a ball organised by the Sardinian embassy in Florence. After that, on 6 October, the couple departed for Piedmont. On 11 October, they reached Castello del Valentino and from there they made their formal entrance into Turin.

The young Maria Theresa was very shy and religious - quite different from Charles Albert's temperament. The couple resided in the Palazzo Carignano, to which Charles Albert began to invite young intellectuals with whom he shared liberal ideas. The most intimate of these friends were Santorre di Rossi de Pomarolo, Roberto d'Azeglio, Giacinto Collegno, Cesare Balbo, Guglielmo Moffa di Lisio Gribaldi and Carlo Emanuele Asinari di San Marzano.

In these years, Charles Albert also suffered from a deep religious crisis. This led to a friendship with the French diplomat Jean Louis de Douhet d'Auzers and a visit by the prince to Rome in 1817 to visit the former king Charles Emmanuel IV, who had retired to a monastery. In the years following his marriage, however, Charles Albert had extramarital affairs with several women, including Marie Caroline de Bourbon, widow of the Duke of Berry.

Maria Theresa had two miscarriages – the second in 1819 as a result of a carriage accident – but gave birth to a son on 14 March 1820, Victor Emmanuel, the future King of Italy.

Participation in the Revolution of 1821 

After the 1820 uprising in Cadiz, King Ferdinand VII of Spain was forced to grant the Spanish Constitution of 1812. Hope of obtaining similar constitutions arose in many European states. Insurrections broke out in Naples and Palermo. On 6 March 1821, Santorre di Rossi de Pomarolo, Giacinto Provana di Collegno, Carlo di San Marzano and Guglielmo Moffa di Lisio (all military officers, officials, or sons of ministers) and Roberto d'Azeglio met with Charles Albert. The young liberals were ready to act and had identified the prince as a new type of man for the House of Savoy - one ready to break with the absolutist past.

The conspirators had no desire to abolish the House of Savoy, but claimed, on the contrary, that they hoped to force it to grant reforms which would grant it the gratitude of the people. During the months of preparation, Charles Albert had assured them of his support and on 6 March he confirmed this, declaring that he supported armed action. They were to raise troops, surround King Victor Emmanuel I's residence at Moncalieri and demand that he grant a constitution and declare war on Austria. Charles Albert was to play the role of mediator between the conspirators and the king.

But on the morning of the next day, 7 March, Charles Albert had second thoughts and informed the conspirators of this. Indeed, he summoned the Minister of War, Alessandro Di Saluzzo di Menusiglio and told him that he had discovered a revolutionary plot. There was an attempt to halt the conspiracy, which nevertheless continued to grow bolder on the next day, with another visit by di Rossi and di Marzano. Yet, they grew uncertain and gave orders to cancel the insurrection, which was due to break out on 10 March. The same day, Charles Albert, full of regret, raced to Moncalieri, where he revealed everything to Victor Emmanuel I and begged for a pardon. The situation had reached a tipping point. In the night, the garrison of Alessandria, commanded by one of the conspirators (Guglielmo Ansaldi), rose up and took control of the city. At this point, the revolutionaries decided to act, despite the abandonment of the prince.

The regency and the Spanish Constitution 

On 11 March 1821, Victor Emmanuel I called a meeting of the council of the Crown, in which Charles Albert also participated. Along with the majority of those who were present, Charles Albert declared his willingness to grant the constitution. Rumours spread however that armed intervention to restore order in Italy by a joint Austrian and Russian force were imminent. The king decided to wait, therefore, but the next day, the Citadel of Turin fell into the hands of the rebels. Victor Emmanuel I then asked Charles Albert and Cesare Balbo to negotiate with the Carbonari, but the latter refused any contact with the two. That evening, as the armed uprising spread, the king abdicated in favour of his brother Charles Felix. Since the latter was in Modena at the time, Charles Albert was appointed regent.

Only 23 years of age, Charles Albert found himself in charge of resolving a serious political crisis which he himself had been responsible for provoking. He tried to negotiate with the rebels, with no results. Terrified, he claimed that it was impossible to take any decisions without the agreement of the new king and therefore sent Charles Felix a letter with an account of the events that had taken place and a request for instructions. But he was also afraid that he would become the object of popular anger if he continued to delay and so, on 13 March 1821, Charles Albert published a proclamation conceding the Spanish Constitution, with the reservation that this grant was pending the approval of the king.

On 14 March, the regent decided to form a Junta which would be able to act as guardians of the parliament. The head was Canon Pier Bernardo Marentini, a Jansenist, who was Vicar-General of the Archdiocese of Turin and had been chosen as Bishop of Piacenza in 1813 but denied the role by the Pope. Charles Albert replaced the minister of war he had appointed the previous day with Santorre di Rossi, the leader of the armed uprising. On 15 March, in the presence of the Junta, Charles Albert swore to observe the Spanish Constitution, which had been amended with a few clauses requested by Victor Emmanuel I's queen, Maria Theresa.

They asked Charles Albert to declare war on Austria in order to free Milan, but the prince refused. Instead, he accepted the advice of Cesare Balbo, who reported the discipline of the armed forces, stopped excesses and firmly established the troops loyal to the king. Charles Felix himself, however, had responded very badly to the news of his brother's abdication, which he considered an "abominable act of violence" and, from Modena, he sent an order to Charles Albert, ordering him to come to Novara, and declaring any actions taken in the name of the king after the abdication of his brother, including the concession of the Spanish Constitution, to be null and void.

Reactionary period (1821–1831)

At midnight on 21 March 1821, Charles Albert secretly departed from the Palazzo Carignano. His departure was not discovered by the revolutionaries until the next day. From Rondissone, on 23 March he made for San Germano, from which he intended to travel to Novara, which remained loyal to the king. At Novara he remained for six days before a dispatch arrived from Charles Felix on the 29th, ordering him to depart immediately for Tuscany.

Florence 
On the afternoon of 2 April 1821, the prince arrived in Florence. His wife and son, who had been in France, followed on the 13th. The Prince's father-in-law, Grand Duke Ferdinand III granted them the Palazzo Pitti as a residence. In May, Charles Felix, who had successfully secured Austrian assistance to restore order, met with Victor Emmanuel I at Lucca. The two discussed Charles Albert's conduct for a long time and, although the new queen Maria Christina spoke in his defense, they decided that he was responsible for the conspiracy.

As a result of this decision and the circumstances, Charles Albert decided to disavow his liberal ideas - especially as Charles Felix had entertained the idea of eliminating him from the line of succession and passing the crown straight to his son Victor Emmanuel. Charles Felix asked the opinion of Metternich on this, who was unexpectedly opposed to the idea.

On 16 September 1822, the infant Victor Emmanuel barely escaped from a fire in his cot, exposing the tenuous nature of the line of succession, which was taken out of danger by the birth of a second son, Ferdinand, on 15 November. In Florence, Charles Albert cultivated various cultural interests. He became a collector of old books, but was also interested in contemporary authors, acquiring the poetry of Alphonse de Lamartine and the conservative Joseph de Maistre.

Spanish Expedition 

At the beginning of 1823, Duke Louis Antoine, Duke of Angoulême assumed command of the French expeditionary force which the European powers had entrusted with the task of suppressing the liberal revolution there and restoring King Ferdinand VII to the Spanish throne, after he had been captured by Spanish revolutionaries in Cadiz. Charles Albert wished to demonstrate his penitence and therefore asked to be part of the contingent. He wrote to Charles Felix on this subject for the first time on 20 February 1823, but only received permission to depart on 26 April.

On 2 May, Charles Albert embarked on the Sardinian frigate Commercio at Livorno, which arrived in Marseilles on 7 May. The next day, Charles Albert set out, arriving in Boceguillas on the 18th. By the time he arrived there, he had been assigned to the division of the French General Étienne de Bordesoulle. on the 24th, he arrived at Madrid, where he remained until 2 June, and then he set out for the south. At a clash with the enemy during the crossing of the Sierra Morena, he demonstrated courage and the French made him a member of the Legion of Honour. He proceeded to Córdoba, Utrera, Jerez de los Caballeros and El Puerto de Santa María, where he waited for the order to attack the fortress of Cadiz, the Trocadero, which was the last remaining refuge of the Spanish constitutional government.

At the end of August 1823, with the French fleet aiding from the sea, the troops launched an assault on the Trocadero. Charles Albert fought at the head of the troops crossing the canal - the sole point of entry to the fortress. He plunged into the water holding the flag of the 6th regiment of the royal guards, forded the canal and leapt into the enemy trenches. He sought to prevent the enemy prisoners being killed, and the French soldiers gave him the epaulettes of an officer killed in the assault, so that he might be distinguished from a regular grenadier.

He remained at his post until nightfall and the next day he was among the first to break into Trocadero. King Ferdinand VII and queen Maria Josepha, his cousin, were freed and embraced him in joy at seeing him. On 2 September there was a grand military parade, after which the Duc d'Angoulême decorated Charles Albert with the Cross of the Order of Saint Louis.

Visit to Paris and return to Turin 

With the dissolution of the expeditionary force, Charles Albert travelled from Seville to Paris, arriving on 3 December 1823. In the French capital he participated in balls, receptions, and parties, and developed a close relationship with Marie Caroline, widow of the Duc de Berry. On 15 December, King Louis XVIII held a grand reception for the victors of Trocadero, at which Charles Albert was among the guests of honour.

King Charles Felix of Sardinia decided that, as a result of his success, it was time for Charles Albert to return to Turin. The prince was required, however, to swear "to respect and religiously maintain all the fundamental laws of the monarchy when I ascend to power, which have led to fortune and glory over the centuries." On 29 January 1824, Charles Albert received permission to depart for Turin. At a final meeting with Louis XVIII, he received some advice on rulership and was enrolled in the Order of the Holy Spirit, the most prestigious chivalrous order of the French monarchy.

On 2 February, Charles Albert departed and on the 6th he reached Mont Cenis, where he received orders to enter Turin by night, in order to avoid protests. Charles Albert did so, probably on the 23rd.

Once he had returned to Turin, Charles Albert resided mainly at Racconigi Castle, where he began preparations for reigning. He began to study a subject whichreceived little attention at court – the economy – and in 1829 he received permission to visit Sardinia. As a result of this visit, he gained an accurate understanding of conditions on the island. He was a prolific writer. In 1827, along with his wife, he wrote 38 fairy tales for their children in French, the language which the family used at home, entitled Contes moraux ("Moral Tales"). The next year, he tried his hand at comedy and after that he occupied himself with literary criticism and history. He would publish three works: Notes on the Waldensians, Records of Andalusia and Voyage to Sardinia. Charles Albert regretted all of these and subsequently ordered them to be withdrawn from circulation. He also wrote a great volume of letters and literary exercises.

Despite the conservative attitudes of the period, Charles Albert also supported literati who held liberal ideas, such as Carlo Giuseppe Guglielmo Botta, whose books were banned in Piedmont.

Accession to the throne 

In 1830, Charles Felix became very ill. He summoned Charles Albert to his sick-bed on 24 April 1831. The entire government was present in the room as the king said to the ministers, "Behold my heir and successor, I am sure that he will act for the good of his subjects."

Charles Felix died on 27 April at 2:45 pm. Charles Albert closed the corpse's eyes and kissed its hand and then assumed the throne. He received the dignitaries of court and brought his sons into the Royal Palace. At 5:00 pm, the troops in rendered their oaths to the new king at the direction of Governor , who published the proclamation relating to this. Thus the throne passed to the House of Carignano and the direct line of Savoy came to an end.

Pro-Austrian period (1831–1845)
Thus Charles Albert came to the throne aged 33. His health was poor; he suffered from a liver disease. His faith added to his suffering; he wore a cilice and slept alone on an iron bed, waking at 5:00 am every morning and celebrating two masses per day. He worked from 10:00 am to 5:00 pm everyday without interruption. He ate little and suffered from frequent religious crises, but never renounced extramarital affairs even so. The most significant of these was his relationship with Maria Antonietta di Robilant (1804–1882), daughter of Friedrich Truchsess zu Waldburg (1776–1844), the Prussian ambassador to Turin and wife of Maurizio di Robilant (1798–1862).

Conflict with Louis Philippe's France 

The new king was affected by the July Revolution, which had deposed Charles X of France and led to the accession of Louis Philippe, an ex-revolutionary, and as a result, he decided to make an alliance with the Austrian Empire. The treaty, signed on 23 July 1831 and ratified in 1836, entrusted the defence of the Kingdom of Sardinia to Austria. However, in the event of war, the commander of the joint forces was to be Charles Albert. He wrote to the Austrian ambassador, Ludwig Senfft von Pilsach (1774–1853), "... the most beautiful day of my life will be the day on which there is war with France and I have the good fortune to serve in the Austrian army."

In accordance with this legitimist position, Charles Albert lent support to his close friend Marie-Caroline de Bourbon-Sicile, duchesse de Berry in December 1823 when she sought to place her son, Henri, on the French throne. She was the widow of the Duc de Berry, second son of Charles X, whose eldest son, Louis Antoine had renounced the throne. Henri's claim to the throne had been denied by the king.

Despite the advice of the French ambassador to exercise prudence, in 1832, Charles Albert loaned Marie-Caroline a million francs and placed a steamer at her disposal for transporting legitimist volunteers to France. The plot was discovered and failed; the steamer was stopped at Marseilles and the volunteers were defeated at Vendée in a few hours. Marie-Caroline fled, but was soon arrested in Nantes and imprisoned in the Citadel of Blaye, near Bordeaux.

Philosophy of rule 
Charles Albert displayed similar conservativism in internal politics. When the minister of war, Matteo Agnès Des Geneys (1763–1831) died, he replaced him with Carlo San Martino d'Aglie, who was not very popular at the time. He retained  as Minister of Foreign Affairs until 1835, when he replaced him with the extremely conservative Clemente Solaro. These appointments were made with the intent of restoring a ministerial oligarchy. In 1831 he appointed Gaudenzio Maria Caccia, Count of Romentino (1765–1834) as minister of Finance,  as Minister of Justice, and the reformer, Antonio Tonduti, Count of Escarèna (1771–1856), as minister of the Interior.

In June 1831, Giuseppe Mazzini, who was in exile in Marseilles, addressed a letter to Charles Albert as "an Italian," in which he encouraged him to focus on the unification of Italy, in vain. For the moment, the new King of Sardinia cleaved to almost the same ideas as his predecessors.

Reforms and cultural initiatives 

Notwithstanding this conservatism, Charles Albert established a Council of State of 14 members who were to investigate the laws and made some moves to modernise the country. He abrogated the special exemptions on import duty for members of the royal family and royal officials, abolished torture, prohibited the mutilation of the corpses of executed criminals and the confiscation of the property of criminals. He also gave notable attention to culture. In 1832, he established the Pinacoteca Regia e della Galleria Reale in the Palazzo Madama (now the Turin City Museum of Ancient Art) and the library of the Palazzo Reale, he built several monuments and palaces, refounded the Academy of Art as the Accademia Albertina in 1833 and established the "Royal Foundation for the Study of the History of the Fatherland", which would become the model for all the similar foundations for historical studies established in the nineteenth century, in the same year.

Charles Albert accompanied these measures with an economic policy of liberalisation of commerce. In 1834, the tax on grain was reduced and the next year, the export of raw silk was made legal. Duties on the import of raw materials (coal, metals, textiles) were subsequently reduced and the acquisition of industrial machinery from abroad was supported. Despite having impinged on some minor sources of state income, the balance of the kingdom was positive from 1835, and it was possible to entertain ambitions for the improvement of agriculture, roads, railroads, and ports.

Charles Albert also reformed the army, reformed the law codes, instituted a Court of cassation, and eliminated feudalism in Sardinia, in 1838. He enabled the opening of institutes of credit, he reformed the public agencies and the state, and reduced the control of the religious hierarchy somewhat. The royal court, however, was full of clerics - at least fifty of them - and the court was sumptuous for such a small kingdom. There were a great number of cooks, butlers, waiters, carpenters, squires, stallers, pages, footmen, masters of ceremonies, etc.

Support for Spanish and Portuguese reactionaries 
After the death of king Ferdinand VII of Spain, the nation was divided into two factions: the anti-liberal reactionaries who supported the legitimist aspirations of Don Carlos and the constitutionalists who defended Maria Christina's regency on behalf of Isabella II. The Holy Alliance of Russia, Austria, and Prussia supported Don Carlos; Great Britain, France and Portugal supported the constitutionalists. Charles Albert sides with the former group, but in the Carlist War of 1833–1840, the constitutionalists prevailed.

Similarly, in the Portuguese Liberal Wars (1828–1834), which followed the death of John VI, Charles Albert sided with the absolutists under Dom Miguel, who spent time in Piedmont. In this case, too, the liberals, led by Dom Miguel's brother Dom Pedro, enjoyed the support of Great Britain and Louis-Philippe's France and were ultimately successful.

Opposition to "Young Italy" 

At the time of Charles Albert's ascent to the throne in 1831, there were riots in Rome, the carbonari revolt of Ciro Menotti in Modena, and an insurrection in Bologna and Parma which led to the flight of Francis IV and Marie Louise. But Austria was able to restore order and Charles Albert decided that his alliance with the Habsburgs was essential.

The Kingdom of Sardinia was also troubled by the plots of revolutionaries in these years, and even by an attempted invasion. In April 1833 in Genoa, two low-ranking officers were arrested for a scuffle and it was discovered that they belonged to Giuseppe Mazzini's Young Italy. They supplied various names and investigations were expanded to other garrisons. Charles Albert, who considered Mazzini's association the "most terrible and bloody," ordered the investigation to continue until it got to the bottom of the matter, acting in accordance with the law, but with utmost severity.

In the end, twelve people were executed by firing squad and two committed suicide in gaol. Twenty-one were condemned to death but could not be executed because they had escaped or, like Mazzini, had been abroad the whole time. Charles Albert granted no pardons, and the ambassadors of France and Britain in Turin protested at court about the severity of the punishment and the lack of any mercy. The King of Sardinia showed his gratitude to the investigators by granting honours to those who had played a leading role in the repression.

Since the insurrections had failed, Mazzini began to plan a military expedition. In 1834, he attempted to organise a force in Switzerland, which would attack Savoy (then part of the Kingdom of Sardinia) and the population would simultaneously rise against the king. But information about this plan was leaked and Charles Albert arranged an ambush. However, the invasion, undertaken on 2 February 1834, failed completely. This was partly due to disorganisation, partially to Swiss efforts to prevent Mazzini's expedition. Only a few conspirators attacked a barracks in Les Échelles. Two of them were captured and executed by firing squad. Carabiniere  was killed in the process, and to honour him Charles Albert instituted the first gold medal for Italian history. Meanwhile, Giuseppe Garibaldi, who was preparing to lead a rising in the city, received a report that it was all over and fled. He was condemned to death in absentia.

Law reform 
In these circumstances, Charles Albert realised the necessity of granting reforms to make the kingdom more modern and to satisfy the needs of the populace. Immediately on ascending to the throne he had named a commission which had been tasked with creating new civil, criminal, commercial and procedural laws.

This process of reform took a very long time, but eventually, on 20 June 1837, the new civil code, partially inspired by the Napoleonic Code, was promulgated. The king also participated in the drafting of the new criminal code, which was published on 26 October 1839. During the process, Charles Albert insisted on the concept of corrective justice, limiting the death penalty as much as possible. Nevertheless, he ordained very severe penalties for those guilty of sacrilege or suicide (whose last wills and testaments had no legal power). In 1842, finally, the commercial code and the code of criminal procedure, with innovative guarantees of the rights of the accused, were promulgated.

Beginning of crisis with Austria 
In 1840 the Oriental Crisis, which placed Louis Philippe's France in conflict with the other European great powers, inspired Charles Albert to begin thinking about a programme of territorial expansion in the Po valley. In the same year, a commercial crisis erupted between Turin and Vienna, regarding an old treaty in which the Kingdom of Sardinia undertook not to provide salt to Switzerland. Following the breach of this treaty, Austria increased the customs duty on Piedmontese wine entering Lombardy-Veneto by 100%. Charles Albert's response was to threaten to build a railroad from Genoa to Lake Maggiore, in order to capture the German commerce which sustained the Austrian port of Trieste for the Ligurian ports.

These were still only minor disputes and diplomatic relations between the two states continued to be generally good, culminating in the magnificent wedding of Charles Albert's eldest son, Victor Emmanuel and Adelaide of Austria, daughter of Ranier Joseph of Habsburg-Lorraine, who was the Austrian Viceroy in Lombardy-Veneto and Charles Albert's brother-in-law, since he had married his sister Elisabeth in 1820. Victor Emmanuel and Adelaide were thus first cousins.

Liberal sovereign (1845–1849) 

In 1845, revolutionary movements erupted in Rimini and in the Papal States. To Massimo d'Azeglio, who had gone to report on the events, Charles Albert said, "that on the day of conflict with Austria, he would throw himself in with his sons, with his army, with all his substance, to fight for the independence of Italy."

Understandably, on 8 June 1846, on the orders of Chancellor Metternich, the Austrian ambassador to Turin, Karl Ferdinand von Buol, asked Charles Albert to clarify his position - was he with Austria or with the revolutionaries? The King of Sardinia hesitated. In the meanwhile, on 16 June, Pope Pius IX had been elected as Pope. His first order of business was to grant an amnesty to those condemned of political crimes. The new pope then protested against Austria for having occupied Ferrara, in the Holy See, without its consent. Charles Albert, who saw in Pius IX a way of reconciling his loyalty with his old liberal ideas, wrote to him offering his support.

In the same way, in September 1847, Charles Albert's secretary, was authorised to write a letter on 2 September, in which the king expressed his hope that God would grant him the power to undertake a war of independence in which he would take command of the army and the Guelph cause. These declarations made Charles Albert far more popular. However, he continued to break up anti-Austrian demonstrations because the court and government remained divided. De La Tour, Foreign Minister Solaro della Margarita, and Archbishop  considered the anti-Austrian policy exceptionally dangerous, but it was supported by Minister of War , Cesare Alfieri di Sostegno, Cesare Balbo, Massimo and Roberto d'Azeglio, and the young Count Cavour.

Meanwhile, the demands of the people became pressing and were not always accepted. In this period, for example, Charles Albert did not accept a Genoese delegation which called for the expulsion of the Jesuits from the Kingdom, whom he had already banned from political writings. He did, however, implement the so-called Perfect Fusion of the Savoyard state on 29 November 1847, which extended the reforms carried out on the mainland to the island of Sardinia.

At the beginning of 1848, news arrived that following the outbreak of the Spring of Nations, Ferdinand II had granted a constitution in the Kingdom of the Two Sicilies. In Turin there were acclamations for the King of Naples and the Pope, while Charles Albert remained bound by the oath he had sworn to Charles Felix to respect religiously all the fundamental laws of the monarchy, and to retain absolutist rule.

The Albertine Statute 

On 7 January 1848, at the hotel Europa in Turin, there was a meeting of the city's journalists at which Cavour, director of the Risorgimento, proposed to request a constitution from the king. The majority of the ministers were also in favour of the concession of a constitution, and of ensuring that one was not imposed by the people. Charles Albert was not sure what to do, unwilling to make the wrong decision and considered abdicating as Victor Emmanuel I had in similar circumstances. He sent for his son to prepare him for the succession, but his son managed to convince him to retain his position.

On 7 February, an extraordinary Council of State was convented. Seven ministers, the holders of the order of the Annunciation, and other high dignitaries were present. All of them spoke and the discussion went on for many hours. Charles Albert, pale, listened in silence. During the lunch break, Charles Albert received a delegation from the capital, which asked for the constitution for the good of the people and in order to safeguard order.

It was now necessary to make a decision and, at last, Giacinto Borelli, Minister of the Interior, was appointed to draft the Constitution immediately. The document was approved and was named the "Statute." Charles Albert had stated that he would not approve the document if it did not clearly state the pre-eminent position of the Catholic religion and the honour of the monarchy. Since he had received these things, he approved it. The meeting was dissolved at dawn.

Around 3:30 in the afternoon on 8 February, a royal edict was published in the streets of Turin, which laid out the 14 articles which formed the basis of the Statute for a system of representative government. By 6:00 pm, the city was entirely lit up and massive demonstrations in favour of Charles Albert were held.

The edict specified that the Catholic faith was the sole state religion, that executive power belonged to the king, as did command of the armed forces. Legislative power was vested in two chambers, one of which would be elected. The free press and individual liberty were guaranteed. The full version of the Statute, with all its articles, was finally agreed on 4 March 1848 and approved the same day by Charles Albert. The announcement of the Statute was met with great enthusiasm throughout Piedmont. The first constitutional government, presided over by Cesare Balbo, was sworn in on 16 March 1848, two days before the beginning of the Five Days of Milan.

The Spring of Nations 

Elected in 1846, the new pope Pius IX had caught the imagination of the liberals of Italy when he began to dismantle the archaic Vatican institutions: granting a free press, instituting the civic guard in place of foreign mercenaries, and creating a council of ministers. On 12 January 1848, there was a revolt in Palermo and King Ferdinand II of the Two Sicilies was forced to concede a constitution, but all Europe was further convulsed when, in February 1848, there was a Revolution in France, King Louis Philippe was deposed, and a Republic was established. The revolution spread to Milan on 18 March, then to Venice, and finally to Vienna, where riots forced Metternich to flee and the abdication of Emperor Ferdinand I.

In Milan, it was expected that Charles Albert would take the opportunity to declare war on Austria. A clear message from Turin was delivered the Milanese liberal,  on 19/20 March:

Although the Kingdom's resources were small, the Piedmontese army began to mobilise. The majority of the troops were deployed on the western border, since the eastern border was safeguarded by the treaty of alliance with Austria. But Charles Albert realised that this was a unique opportunity to expand his holdings into Lombardy. Thus he told the Milanese that he would intervene on their behalf if they agreed to join the Kingdom of Sardinia.

On 23 March 1848, the Piedmontese embassy to Milan returned to Turin with news that the Austrians had been forced to evacuate the city and that a provisional government headed by Gabrio Casati had been established, which asked Charles Albert to become an ally. Clearly not very enthusiastic about the idea of annexation, the Milanese asked the king to keep his troops outside the city and to adopt the tricolor of the Cisalpine Republic as his flag.

Although he had received no guarantee that the Milanese would agree to annexation, Charles Albert accepted the conditions of the Milanese and asked only that the flag of the house of Savoy be placed in the middle of the tricolor (This would henceforth be the flag of the Kingdom of Sardinia and then the Kingdom of Italy until the fall of the monarchy in 1946). He was about to enter into a war with a major power, whose troops in Italy were commanded by one of the greatest living generals, Joseph Radetzky von Radetz. His reactionary past forgotten, the king appeared on the balcony of the royal palace, flanked by the Milanese representatives, waving the tricolor, while the people applauded and shouted, "Long live Italy! Long live Charles Albert. Within a year his reign would be over.

First Italian War of Independence 

On 23 March 1848, the proclamation of Charles Albert to the people of Lombardy and Veneto was published, in which he assured them that the Piedmontese troops, "... go now to offer, in the final trials, that help which a brother expects from a brother, a friend from a friend. We will comply with your just requests, trusting in the aid of God, who is clearly with us, of God, who has given Italy Pius IX, of God, whose miraculous prompting places Italy in the position to act for itself." Thus, the war began.

The federalist Carlo Cattaneo was not impressed, "Now that the enemy is in flight, the king wants to come with the whole army. He should have sent us anything - even a single cart of powder - three days ago. There was heard, in Piedmont, for five days, the thundering of the guns which consumed us: The king knew and did not move."

Initial campaign 

Charles Albert left Turin on the evening of 26 March 1848 for Alessandria, in order to take command of the army and then advanced to Voghera. He was preoccupied with the delay of the provisional government of Milan's acceptance of annexation by the Kingdom of Sardinia. The Austrians however had regrouped on the River Mincio, at one corner of the Quadrilatero. On 29 March, the king entered Pavia in triumph, where he was met by some envoys of the Milanese government. On 2 April, Charles Albert was in Cremona, on 5 April at Bozzolo, on 6 April at Asola, on 8 April at Castiglione delle Stiviere, and on 11 April at Volta Mantovana, only four kilometres from the Mincio. After nearly two weeks, he had made it to the front.

At the opening of hostilities, on 8 and 9 April, Italian sharpshooters had achieved success in the first battle of the campaign at the Battle of Goito. After crossing the Mincio with his army, Charles Albert achieved another victory on 30 April at Pastrengo, where he saw the front lines. The units under his command attacked some Austrians who had been dispersed by a charge of the carabinieri on horseback. On 2 May, in the midst of this triumphant atmosphere, news arrived that Pius IX had withdrawn his military and political support for the Italian cause.

Nevertheless, the Papal soldiers in the army did not withdraw, choosing to remain to fight as volunteers, but Charles Albert had lost the moral justification for his mission. His dream of becoming the sword of the papacy and king of an Italy united under the Pope, as Vincenzo Gioberti had proposed, was thwarted. Yet the king was undiscouraged and continued to advance towards Verona, where a harsh and indecisive battle was fought with the Austrians at Santa Lucia on 6 May.

Two further events followed in the next few days. On 21 May, the contingent of 14,000 men from the Neapolitan army which were en route to fight against the Austrians, were ordered by Ferdinand II to return home in light of Pius IX's decision. Then on 25 May, the Austrian reinforcements which had been travelling through Veneto, joined Radetzky's troops at Verona. Charles Albert was ambitious but had only modest strategic abilities and he could not realistically continue the war alone. The Battle of Goito and the surrender of Peschiera on 30 May were his last successes. The Austrians conquered Vicenza on 10 June, dispersing the Papal volunteers and finally obtained a decisive victory over the Piedmontese in the Battle of Custoza, which lasted from the 22 to 27 July.

In the meantime, on 8 June, the Milanese and Lombards had voted with an overwhelming majority to join the Kingdom of Sardinia, as had the citizens of the Duchy of Parma on 2 May. But for Charles Albert, things were going sour: the soldiers were angry about the recent defeat and were hungry and exhausted. A council of war suggested seeking a truce.

Events in Milan and the armistice of Salasco 

On the evening of 27 July 1848, the Austrians agreed to grant a truce if the Piedmontese withdrew to the west bank of the Adda (a little more than 20 km east of Milan), surrendered all the fortresses, including Peschiera and yielded the Duchies of Parma and Modena, whose rulers had been forced into exile. Charles Albert, who disagreed with his son Victor Emmanuel on the conduct of the war, exclaimed "I would rather die!" and prepared to make a stand at the Oglio (about 25 km further east than requested by Radetzky).

Although the Austrian proposal had been rejected, his troops ended up having to withdraw to the Adda anyway, because the Oglio was judged to be an inadequate defensive line. At the Adda, some manoeuvres taken by a general on his own initiative left a division isolated and made it necessary to withdraw again, in order to retreat inside the walls of Milan.

The day after, the Milanese learnt of the agreement and revealed their fury. The crowd protested in front of the Palazzo Greppi and when the King came out on the balcony, they fired their rifles at him. According to the noblewoman Cristina Trivulzio di Belgiojoso, who participated actively in the riots in Milan:
 The Charles Albert's second son, Ferdinand and general Alfonso Ferrero La Marmora carried the king to safety. In the night he departed from Milan with the army.

On 8 August, general  returned to Milan and negotiated an armistice with the Austrians, known as the Armistice of Salasco, which was signed on 9 August. Charles Albert ratified the armistice despite some opposition, including from Gioberti, who remained confident of aid from France. The king said that the former French foreign minister, Alphonse de Lamartine, had declared that the French would only give such aid to Republicans.

The second campaign and the abdication 

The king was not proud of the campaign and, once he had written a record of the first campaign, Charles Albert decided to break the armistice. On 1 March, at the inauguration of the legislature, he spoke clearly about war and Chamber responded positively. For the imminent resumption of hostilities, the king was convinced to renounce effective command of the army, which he continued to hold formally. Rather than appointing a Piedmontese general, he selected the Polish general Wojciech Chrzanowski as commander of the army. On 8 March, the council of war in Turin decided that the armistice would be broken on the 12th. According to the terms of the armistice, hostilities would then begin eight days later on 20 March.

The war did indeed resume on that day. On 22 March, Charles Albert arrived at Novara and a day later, Radetzy attacked the city from the south with superior numbers, near the village of Bicocca. Chrzanowski made some significant tactical errors and despite the bravery of the Piedmontese and Charles Albert himself, who fought along with his son Ferdinand in the front lines, the Battle of Novara proved a disastrous defeat.

Returning to the Palazzo Bellini in Novara, the king declared, "Bicocca was lost and retaken three or four times, before our troops were forced to yield... the Major General [Chrzanowski] employed all his strength, my sons did everything they could, the Duke of Genoa [Ferdinand] lost two horses from under himself. Now we have withdrawn within the city, on its walls, with the enemy below, with an exhausted army - further resistance is impossible. It is necessary to request an armistice."

Austria's conditions were very harsh: occupation of the Lomellina and the fortress of Alessandria, as well as the surrender of all the Lombards who had fought against Austria. Charles Albert asked the generals if it was possible for a final push to open a path to Alessandria. They said it was not: the army was in pieces, discipline had crumbled, many soldiers fighting in the campaign were despoiling the houses in the countryside and they feared an attack on the king himself.

At 9:30 pm on the same day, Charles Albert summoned his sons, Chrzanowski, generals Alessandro Ferrero La Marmora, Giovanni Durando,  (who had negotiated the armistice) and minister Carlo Cadorna. He confessed that he had no choice but to abdicate. They tried to dissuade him, but, in the hope that Victor Emmanuel could get better terms, he ended the discussion, "My decision is the fruit of mature reflexion. From this moment, I am no longer the king; the king is Victor, my son."

Exile (1849) 

Charles Albert's eldest son became king of Sardinia as Victor Emmanuel II and agreed to an armistice with Radetzky on 24 March 1849 at Vignale, effectively obtaining more favourable terms than previously offered. The Austrians were to occupy Lomellina for a while and only half of the fort of Alessandria, with "permission" rather than "by right".

Voyage to Portugal 
Charles Albert, however, had left Palazzo Bellini in Novara a few minutes after midnight on 23 March. His carriage travelled to Orfengo (on the road halfway between Novara and Vercelli), probably without any specific destination in mind, but after a little while he was stopped at an Austrian roadblock. Charles Albert identified himself as the Count of Barge (a title which he actually possessed) and a colonel of the Piedmontese army. General Georg Thurn Valsassina (1788-1866) interrogated him and it is not clear whether he recognised him or not. Having been confirmed as the Count of Barge by a captured sharpshooter (when asked "can you confirm that this is the Count of Barge?" the soldier responded, "He is the Count of Barge."), Charles Albert was allowed to pass and continued his journey to the southwest.

The former king continued via Moncalvo, Nizza Monferrato, Acqui, Savona, Ventimiglia and Monaco, which he reached on 26 March. At Nice in France, he dispatched instructions to organise his family affairs, without adding any information for his wife. On 1 April he was at Bayonne, near the Atlantic coast, and on 3 April he received a message from Turin in order to get him to legally confirm his abdication.

Charles Albert continued through Torquemada, Valladolid, León, and A Coruña, which he reached on 10 April, and which was the end of the carriage road. On horseback, suffering from illness, he reached Lugo on 15 April and entered Portuguese territory at Caminha. From there he went to Viana do Castelo, Póvoa de Varzim and, finally, on 19 April, at noon, he arrived in Oporto. From there he may have planned to travel to America, but he was forced to stop because he had become ill with a liver complaint.

Final days in Oporto 

Once his arrival in Oporto became known, Charles Albert was hosted at the Hotel do Peixe, where he remained for two weeks, as his condition worsened. Then he accepted a new residence from a private individual on the rua de Entre Quintas, with a view of the ocean. On 3 May, he hosted Giacinto Provana di Collegno and Luigi Cibrario, who brought him greetings from the Piedmontese government. To them he said: 

During this time, Charles Albert suffered from progressive decay, coughing and abscesses. He had two heart attacks, but the doctors considered the condition of his liver the most serious issue, for which the former king abstained from eating very much and fasted on Wednesdays. He read the letters and newspapers which arrived from Italy. He wrote occasionally to his wife, but regularly and with feeling to the Countess of Robilant. He forbade his mother, wife, and children from visiting.

In the month after his arrival, his health had deteriorated irreparably. From 3 July, he was assisted by the doctor Alessandro Riberi, whom Victor Emmanuel had sent from Turin. He was no longer able to get out of bed and coughing fits were ever more frequent. He passed the night of 27 July in great difficulty. On the morning of 28 July, he seemed better, but then deteriorated as a result of a third heart attack. The Portuguese priest don Antonio Peixoto, who had assisted him spiritually, met with him and administered extreme unction. Charles Albert whispered in Latin, In manus tuas, Domine, commendo spiritum meum (Into your hands, God, I entrust my spirit). He fell asleep with the crucifix on his chest and died at 3:30 in the afternoon, a little over 51 years old.

His body was embalmed and displayed in the Cathedral of Oporto. On 3 September, the ships, Mozambano and Goito arrived under the command of his cousin Eugene Emmanuel. On 19 September the corpse was brought on board the Monzambano, which departed for Genoa that evening. It arrived on 4 October. The day after, the body was solemnly interred in the crypt of the Basilica of Superga, where it still lies.

Legacy
Friedrich Engels:

Among the indigenous princes, the number one enemy of Italian freedom was and is Charles Albert. Italians should bear in mind and repeat every hour the old saying: "God watch over my friends, so that I can watch over my enemies". From Ferdinand of the House of Bourbon, there is nothing to fear; he has for a long time been discredited. Charles Albert, on the other hand, calls himself pompously the "liberator of Italy" while on the very people he is supposed to be liberating he imposes as a condition the yoke of his rule.

An American historian says he was
A strange pathetic being, at odds with himself and his time; compounded of monkish asceticism and soldierly courage; autocratic, but irresolute; holding his honor dearer than his life, yet pursued through life by accusations of dishonor: such was Charles Albert, to whom when he had passed beyond the reach of their praises or their blame, his countrymen gave the epithet 'magnanimous'.

Family and children
In 1817, Charles Albert married his second cousin once removed, Maria Theresa of Austria, the youngest daughter of Ferdinand III, Grand Duke of Tuscany, and Princess Luisa of Naples and Sicily. The couple had the following children:

 Victor Emmanuel II (1820–1878); married Adelaide of Austria.
 Prince Ferdinand of Savoy (1822–1855), Duke of Genoa; married Princess Elisabeth of Saxony.
 Princess Maria Cristina of Savoy (1826–1827) died in infancy.

Orders and decorations
 :
 Knight of the Supreme Order of the Most Holy Annunciation, 1 November 1816
 Founder of the Civil Order of Savoy, 29 October 1831
 :
 Knight of the Military Order of Maria Theresa, 1823
 Grand Cross of the Royal Hungarian Order of St. Stephen, 1825
  Spain: Knight of the Order of the Golden Fleece, 13 October 1823
  Kingdom of France: Knight of the Order of the Holy Spirit, 5 February 1824
 :
 Knight of the Order of St. George, 4th Class, February 1824
 Knight of the Order of St. Andrew the Apostle the First-called, 1831
 Knight of the Order of St. Alexander Nevsky
 :
 Grand Cross of the Order of St. Ferdinand and Merit
 Knight of the Order of Saint Januarius, 1829
  Grand Duchy of Tuscany: Grand Cross of the Order of St. Joseph
  Kingdom of Prussia: Knight of the Order of the Black Eagle, 22 December 1832
 : Grand Cordon of the Order of Leopold, 2 September 1840

Ancestry

See also
 Statuto Albertino
 First Italian War of Independence
 Risorgimento

Notes

Bibliography

Further reading
 
 Robertson, Priscilla. Revolutions of 1848: a social history (1952). pp 309–401.
 Smith, Denis Mack, Modern Italy: A Political History (University of Michigan Press: Ann Arbor, 1997).
  old interpretations but useful on details

External links

 
 Genealogy of recent members of the House of Savoy
 

1798 births
1849 deaths
19th-century kings of Sardinia
Nobility from Turin
Burials at the Basilica of Superga
19th-century Italian people
Princes of Savoy
Princes of Carignan
Military personnel from Turin
Grand Masters of the Gold Medal of Military Valor
Claimant Kings of Jerusalem
People of the First Italian War of Independence
Modern history of Italy
Knights of the Golden Fleece of Spain
Monarchs who abdicated
Italian exiles
Grand Croix of the Légion d'honneur
Knights Cross of the Military Order of Maria Theresa
Grand Crosses of the Order of Saint Stephen of Hungary
Recipients of the Order of St. George of the Fourth Degree
Italian people of Polish descent